Ramkola is a town and a nagar panchayat in Kushinagar district which is also known as Padrauna district in the Indian state of Uttar Pradesh.

Geographically Ramkola is a fertile agricultural region and is known for large scale sugarcane cultivation. The only town in India having two sugar factories (one govt unit is closed now).

Geography
It has an average elevation of 75 metres (246 feet).

Temples

Vishva Darshan Temple is in Ramkola and contains idols of almost all of the saints and great philosophers from all over the world. The temple was built by the saint Swami Bhagwananand Ji Maharaj in the respect of his guru ji Swami Paramhans Ji. This place is the birthplace of the saint Swami Parmanand Ji Mahraj (Paramhans Ji)  of Anusuiya Ashram, Chitrakoot, Uttar Pradesh. Because of this Ramkola is known as Ramkola Dham.

Demographics
As reported in the 2011 India census, Ramkola had a population of 14,433. Males constituted 53% of the population, and females 47%. Ramkola had an average literacy rate of 69%, lower than the national average of 74%.

References

Cities and towns in Kushinagar district